Doug Mallory (born November 2, 1964) is an American football coach and former player.  Currently Mallory serves as a defensive football analyst for the Michigan Wolverines.  He has been a college football coach since 1988.  He was the assistant head coach and co-defensive coordinator at Indiana University from 2011-2013.  He has previously held defensive coordinator positions at Western Kentucky University, Louisiana State University and the University of New Mexico. Mallory also played college football as a defensive back at Michigan from 1984 to 1987.

Early years
Mallory is the middle son of former college football coach Bill Mallory. Doug attended DeKalb High School in DeKalb, Illinois, while his father was the head coach at Northern Illinois.

Mallory played college football for the Michigan Wolverines under head coach Bo Schembechler from 1984 to 1987. He was a reserve defensive back on the 1985 team that won the Fiesta Bowl and finished No. 2 in both the AP and Coaches Polls. He played on the same defense as his older brother Mike, a senior All-Big Ten linebacker. Mallory was named a co-captain as a senior of the 1987 team. Mallory finished his Michigan career with 182 tackles and 6 interceptions.

Coaching career
Mallory began his coaching career at Indiana University Bloomington as a graduate assistant for his father, Bill, who had become the Hoosiers’ head coach in 1984. After coaching stops at Army, Western Kentucky, Indiana and Maryland, he was hired by Les Miles to coach the secondary at Oklahoma State. From 2001–2004, Mallory’s OSU secondary intercepted 54 passes.

When Miles was hired in 2005 to be the head coach at Louisiana State University, Mallory followed him to Baton Rouge to become the defensive backs coach for the Tigers. After 3 years in this position, including the 2007–08 National Championship season, Mallory was promoted to co-defensive coordinator.

Mallory spent the 2009 and 2010 seasons at the defensive coordinator at the University of New Mexico before being hired back to Indiana. Under head coach Kevin Wilson, Mallory has served as the assistant head coach, co-defensive coordinator, and safeties coach for the Hoosiers.

On January 10, 2014, Indiana announced that Mallory would not be returning for the 2014 season.

On February 10, 2015, Mallory was introduced as a part of the coaching staff for Dan Quinn of the Atlanta Falcons.

In the 2016 season, Mallory and the Falcons reached Super Bowl LI, where they faced the  New England Patriots. In the Super Bowl, the Falcons fell in a 34–28 overtime defeat.

Personal life
Mallory’s father, Bill, is the winningest coach in Indiana football history. Mallory has two brothers that are currently football coaches: Older brother Mike, is the special teams coordinator for the Jacksonville Jaguars of the NFL, and younger brother, Curt, is the head coach for the Indiana State Sycamores football team. All 3 brothers played collegiately for the Michigan Wolverines. He has an eldest sister, Barb.

Doug and his wife, Lisa, have three daughters – Emily, Allison, and Sarah.

References

External links
 Indiana profile

1964 births
Living people
American football defensive backs
Army Black Knights football coaches
Atlanta Falcons coaches
Indiana Hoosiers football coaches
LSU Tigers football coaches
Maryland Terrapins football coaches
Michigan Wolverines football players
New Mexico Lobos football coaches
Oklahoma State Cowboys football coaches
Western Kentucky Hilltoppers football coaches
People from Bowling Green, Ohio
People from DeKalb, Illinois
Coaches of American football from Illinois
Players of American football from Illinois